Jack R. Henry (March 1, 1926 – September 2, 2018) was an American football player and coach. He served as the head football coach at Texas State University (then known as Southwest Texas State University) for a single season, in 1960, compiling a record of 2–8.

Henry was a multiple-sport athlete at Southwest Texas State and was later inducted into the Texas High School Coaches Association Hall of Fame.

Head coaching record

College

References

1926 births
2018 deaths
Texas State Bobcats baseball players
Texas State Bobcats football players
Texas State Bobcats men's basketball players
Texas State Bobcats football coaches
High school football coaches in Texas
Coaches of American football from Texas
Players of American football from San Antonio
Baseball players from San Antonio
Basketball players from San Antonio